Dumont is a small unincorporated community and U.S. Post Office situated along Clear Creek in Clear Creek County, Colorado, United States.  The Dumont Post Office has the ZIP Code 80436.  Dumont is a part of the Downieville-Lawson-Dumont census-designated place.

History
Dumont is named for John M. Dumont, a mine operator.

Geography
Dumont is located at  (39.764478,-105.599213).

See also

 Denver-Aurora Metropolitan Statistical Area
 Denver-Aurora-Boulder Combined Statistical Area
 Front Range Urban Corridor
 List of cities and towns in Colorado

References

External links

Unincorporated communities in Clear Creek County, Colorado
Unincorporated communities in Colorado
Denver metropolitan area